George Ottinger "Ott" Romney (December 12, 1892 – May 3, 1973) was an American football player, coach of football, basketball, and track, and college athletics administrator.  While directing the department at Montana State Agricultural College (now Montana State University- Bozeman) he served as head coach in football, track and basketball from 1922 to 1927 and at  Brigham Young University (BYU) from 1928 to 1936, compiling a career college football record of 72–51–8.  Romney served as head basketball coach at Montana State Agricultural College from 1922 to 1928. The program built teams that were honored by the Helms Foundation as some of the best of the early 20th Century, pioneering the Fast Break’ offense, successfully coupled with high pressure defense. The ‘Golden Bobcats’ under his successor, Schubert Dyche, won national recognition and two players, John ‘Cat’ Thompson and Frank Ward, were named as ‘All  Americans’. 
At BYU from 1928 to 1935, Romney amassed a career college basketball mark of 283–102.  In addition, Romney coached football and track at BYU and served as the school's athletic director.

Coaching career
Romney was the third head football coach at Brigham Young University (BYU). He coached for nine years, from 1928 to 1936. His overall record at BYU was 44–31–6. His best year in coaching was in 1932 when he went 8–1 and took second in the Rocky Mountain Conference.

Honors, family, death
Montana State University honored Romney by naming the first gymnasium built on campus after him.  Although later replaced as the main sports facility by a large multipurpose field house named for his player John "Brick" Breeden, the Romney Gymnasium, now Romney Hall, still stands on the main quad of the Bozeman campus. MSU sought funding for the Romney repurposing from the Montana Legislature for nearly a decade until, in April 2019, the Legislature approved $25 million for Romney Hall. With these funds, and an additional $7 million raised from generous donors, MSU could proceed with transforming the marginally usable building into an energy-efficient "hero" building that will be used by nearly every student to attend Montana State for generations to come.

Romney is a first cousin of former Michigan Governor George W. Romney, and his son, former Massachusetts Governor Mitt Romney is named for Ott's younger brother.  G. Ott Romney was named after his maternal grandfather George M. Ottinger although, since his father was George Ernest Romney and his other grandfather was also named George Romney, it might have been more complex than this. He died of a heart ailment in 1973.

Head coaching record

Football

References

External links
 

1892 births
1973 deaths
American men's basketball coaches
Basketball coaches from Utah
BYU Cougars athletic directors
BYU Cougars football coaches
BYU Cougars men's basketball coaches
Montana State Bobcats football coaches
Montana State Bobcats men's basketball coaches
Utah Utes football players
Utah State University faculty
College track and field coaches in the United States
Romney family
Sportspeople from Salt Lake City
Players of American football from Salt Lake City